Devonport Park is a public park located in Devonport, Devon. The historic park dates back to the 1850s and is situated on former military land. The park is home to many historic monuments including a war memorial to the 2,000 Devonport citizens who died in the First World War.

References 

Geography of Plymouth, Devon
Parks and open spaces in Devon